Brock Sunderland (born November 11, 1979) was the General Manager of the Edmonton Elks (formerly known as the Edmonton Eskimos) in the Canadian Football League from 2017 until 2021. He won the Grey Cup as the Assistant General Manager of the Ottawa Redblacks in 2016.  Previously, he was a college and pro scout with the New York Jets from 2007 to 2012. He started his pro management career as a regional scout for the Montreal Alouettes in 2004, working his way up to Director of Scouting under Jim Popp. He attended the University of Montana, where he was a kick returner and receiver on the Montana Grizzlies football team.

CFL GM record

References

1979 births
Living people
Edmonton Elks general managers
Ottawa Redblacks general managers
Sportspeople from Missoula, Montana